Dubai in the United Arab Emirates had become a popular destination for company registration. The attraction of UAE is born out of its widely known tax free status although that is changing with the introduction of Value added Tax(VAT) and Corporate tax. The popular route for the investors is to register a company in the UAE and open a bank account in the company's name. All companies offer Residence Visas to owners and employees.

UAE has 7 Emirates namely:

 Abu Dhabi
 Dubai
 Sharjah
 Ajman
 Umm-al-Quwain
 Ras-al- Khaimah
 Fujairah

All of them have their own regime/ Free zone and Mainland jurisdiction or registration authorities. UAE has 3 popular forms of companies that is: Mainland, Free zone and Offshore companies.

Each emirate has at least one free zone:

Free zones compete with each other by introducing special promotions and features for their companies. Each emirate has is own economic department which registers mainland companies.

To do business in he UAE one needs to own a company that holds a trade license. A list of permitted activities is used o choose one that suits one's business. For some activities a clearance is required from concerned authorities as given below:-

Overview of Company Registration on Mainland Dubai 
Mainland Dubai is the most popular destination for company registration in the United Arab Emirates. The process is simple and straightforward, and there are many incentives for businesses to set up here.

Mainland Dubai is administered by the Dubai Economic Department, which is responsible for issuing licenses and permits. Companies must first select a business activity from the list of approved activities, and then apply for a trade license. Once the license is issued, the company can start operating.

There are many benefits to setting up a company in Mainland Dubai. First, the process is relatively simple and straightforward. Second, there are a number of incentives for businesses, including tax exemptions and access to a large pool of potential customers. Finally, Mainland Dubai is a well-established jurisdiction with a strong reputation for doing business.

Benefits for Dubai Mainland Company Formation 
There are many benefits for Dubai Mainland company formation, including the following:

-Access to the UAE market: Mainland companies have direct access to the UAE market, which is one of the largest and most lucrative markets in the world.

-Flexible business activities: Mainland companies can conduct any legal business activity in the UAE.

-Free zone benefits: Mainland companies can avail of the benefits offered by free zones, such as 100% foreign ownership, tax-free environment, and easy company setup.

-UAE residency visas: Mainland companies can sponsor UAE residency visas for their employees and their families.

-Access to government contracts: Mainland companies can participate in government tenders and contracts.

The benefits of Dubai Mainland company formation make it an attractive option for businesses of all types and sizes.

References 

Business in the United Arab Emirates
Entrepreneurship